Association Sportive Pueu, formerly known as Association Sportive Taravao, is a football club from Taiarapu-Est, Tahiti. It currently competes in the Tahiti Ligue 1. They last compete on Ligue 1 in the season 2009/10.

Last seasons

Current squad
Squad for the 2020–21 Tahiti Ligue 1

References

External links 
AS Pueu Facebook Page

Football clubs in Tahiti
Football clubs in French Polynesia